Linda Craig Thomas is a former American politician who served as a member of the Washington House of Representatives from 1985 to 1987.  She represented Washington's 26th legislative district as a Republican.

References

Republican Party members of the Washington House of Representatives
Women state legislators in Washington (state)